Sea Point (Afrikaans: Seepunt) is one of Cape Town's most affluent and densely populated suburbs, situated between Signal Hill and the Atlantic Ocean, a few kilometres to the west of Cape Town's Central Business District (CBD). Moving from Sea Point to the CBD, one passes first through the small suburb of Three Anchor Bay, then Green Point. Seaward from Green Point is the area known as Mouille Point (pronounced MOO-lee), where the local lighthouse is situated. It borders to the southwest the suburb of Bantry Bay.

Sea Point is the only seaside suburb of Cape Town with significant high-rise development and this, along with other factors, has made it a very popular residential area, or for investing in first or second homes and apartments.

Demographics

The area was historically classed as a "whites only" area only during the apartheid era under the terms of the Group Areas Act, a series of South African laws that restricted urban areas according to racial classifications With the collapse of apartheid and especially from the late 1990s, a diverse mix of residents emerged and changed the demographic makeup. According to the 2011 census, the white population was at 67.7%

Layout and lifestyle

Sea Point is a suburb of Cape Town and is situated on a narrow stretch of land between Cape Town's well known Lion's Head to the southeast and the Atlantic Ocean to the northwest. It is a high-density area where houses are built in close proximity to one another toward the surrounding mountainside. Apartment buildings are more common in the central area and toward the beachfront. An important communal space is the beachfront promenade, a paved walkway along the beachfront used for strolling, jogging, or socialising. Along the litoral of the Sea Point promenade, the coastline has varied characteristics. Some parts are rocky and difficult to access, while other parts have broad beaches. Sea Point beach adjoins an Olympic-sized seawater swimming pool, which has served generations of Capetonians since at least the early 1950s. Further toward the city is a beach known as Rocklands.

Adjoining Sea Point is Three Anchor Bay. The beaches along this stretch are in the main covered with mussel shells tossed up by the surf, unlike the beaches of Clifton and Camps Bay, which are sandy. The rocks off the beaches at Sea Point are in large part late Precambrian metamorphic rocks of the Malmesbury formation, formed by low-grade metamorphism of fine-grained sediments. The site is internationally famous in the history of geology. A plaque on the rocks commemorates Charles Darwin's observation of the rare geological interface, where granite, an igneous rock, has invaded, absorbed, and replaced the Malmesbury formation rocks. There are extensive beds of kelp offshore. Compared to the False Bay side of the Cape Peninsula, the water is colder (11–16 °C).

The community of Sea Point was the subject of a 2008 documentary film directed by François Verster, entitled Sea Point Days.

Graaf's Pool, a beachfront tidal pool partially demolished in 2005, was the subject of a short film entitled "Behind the Wall", which contrasted the pool's origin story of Lady Marais, paralysed from the waist down from childbirth, whose husband built the pool for her as a private bathing area in the 1930s, and the Sea Point gay scene, which adopted the pool as a cruising ground between the 1960s and the 2000s.

In the period May 2020 through February 2021, there were 135 apartments sold in the suburb at an average price of R 33255 / m².

Local schools
Schools in the area include Sea Point Primary School and Sea Point High School (formerly Sea Point Boys' High School) founded in 1884, and Herzlia Weizmann Primary. The French School of Cape Town opened on 14 October 2014 after an R18m upgrade of the primary school of the old Tafelberg Remedial School's campus. The primary school campus of the French school is in Sea Point.

History
Some of the first settlers in the area were the aristocratic Protestant Le Sueur family from Bayeux in Normandy. François Le Sueur arrived in 1739 as spiritual advisor to Cape Governor Hendrik Swellengrebel. The family's Cape estate, Winterslust, originally covered 200 acres on the slopes of Signal Hill. The estate was later named Fresnaye, and now forms part of the suburbs of Sea Point and Fresnaye.

Sea Point got its name in 1767 when one of the commanders serving under Captain Cook, Sam Wallis, encamped his men in the area to avoid a smallpox epidemic in Cape Town at the time. It grew as a residential suburb in the early 1800s, and in 1839 was merged into a single municipality with neighbouring Green Point. The 1875 census indicated that Sea Point and Green Point jointly had a population of 1,425. By 1904 it stood at 8,839.

With the 1862 opening of the Sea Point tramline, the area became Cape Town's first "commuter suburb", though the line linked initially to Camps Bay. At the turn of the century, the tramline was augmented by the Metropolitan and Suburban Railway Company, which added a line to the City Centre.

During the 1800s, Sea Point's development was dominated by the influence of its most famous resident, the liberal parliamentarian and MP for Cape Town, Saul Solomon. Solomon was both the founder of the Cape Argus and the most influential liberal in the country - constantly fighting racial inequality in the Cape. His Round Church (St John's) of 1878 reflected his syncretic approach to religion - housing 4 different religions in its walls, which were rounded to avoid "denominational corners". "Solomon's Temple", as it was humorously known by residents, stood on its triangular traffic island at the intersection of Main, Regent, and Kloof roads, a centre of the Sea Point community, until it was destroyed by the city council in the 1930s. 
The suburb was later classed by the Apartheid regime as a whites-only area, but this rapidly changed in the late 1990s with a rapid growth of Sea Point's black and coloured communities.

Ships entering the harbour in Table Bay from the east coast of Africa have to round the coast at Sea Point and over the years many of them have been wrecked on the reefs just off-shore. In May 1954, during a great storm, the Basuto Coast (246 tonnes) ended up on the rocks within a few metres of the concrete wall of the promenade. A fireman who came to the assistance of the crew was swept off the wall of the swimming pool adjacent to the promenade by waves and was never seen again. The vessel was soon thereafter salvaged for scrap. In July 1966 a large cargo ship, the S.A. Seafarer, was stranded on the rocks only a couple of hundred metres from the Three Anchor Bay beach. The stranding was the cause of one of Cape Town's earliest great environmental scares, owing to the cargo including drums of tetramethyl lead and tetraethyl lead, volatile and highly toxic compounds that in those days were added to motor fuels as an anti-knocking agent. The ship was gradually destroyed by the huge swells that habitually roll in from the south Atlantic. Salvage from the ship can still be found in local antique shops.

In the mid to late 1990s, the area experienced a rise in crime as drug dealers and prostitutes moved into the area. However, due to the aggressive adoption of broken windows municipal management spearheaded by then area councillor Jean-Pierre Smith, the crime rate declined throughout most of the 2000s.

On the morning of 20 January 2003, nine men were killed in a brutal attack at the Sizzler's massage parlour in Sea Point.

Sea Point forms part of Ward 54 in The City Of Cape Town, and is represented by Democratic Alliance councillor Nicola Jowell.

Notable people
 John Whitmore, surfer, surfboard shaper, radio presenter, Springbok surfing team manager, Hobie Cat King, knifemaker
 Anthony Sher, actor and writer.
 Sally Little, professional golfer.
 Saul Solomon, liberal Cape politician.
 Colin Eglin, politician.
 Gerry Brand, Springboks rugby union footballer.
 David Rosen (artist), fashion designer and artist.
 Bob Newson, cricketer.
 Karen Press, poet.
 Jacobus Arnoldus Graaff, businessman and politician, commissioned the construction of Graaff's Pool.
 Louise Smit writer of popular South African television shows, Wielie Walie and Haas Das.
 Arno Carstens singer-songwriter.
 Ben Trovato satirist, columnist
 Darrel Bristow-Bovey, writer
 Kevin Atkinson, artist
 Hein Wicht, writer (Hein's family home was "Spieka" at 3 Victoria rd which was named after the German village his great grandfather emigrated from, built in Victorian style and gifted by his grandfather to his father. Grandfather owned older "Mermaid Cottage" which was later re christened "Rapallo". An apartment block of the same name now occupies the space in Beach road, Sea Point.)
 Allison Foat ballerina turned publicist and travel journalist

Coat of arms
The Green and Sea Point municipal council assumed a coat of arms in 1901.  The shield was divided vertically, one half depicting signal masts on Signal Hill, the other a golden lion's head, shoulders and forepaws;  in the centre, near the top, was a small blue shield displaying three anchors.  An imperial crown was placed above the shield. The coat of arms has been incorporated into the emblem of the Metropolitan Golf Club

References

External links

The Wreck of the S.A. Seafarer
Lance Real Estate Sea Point Property Review

Jews and Judaism in Cape Town
Orthodox Jewish communities
Orthodox Judaism in South Africa
Suburbs of Cape Town